Matthew "Matt" Chow Hoi-Kwong (born 4 August 1968) is a Hong Kong screenwriter, director, actor and producer.  He is best known for his romantic comedy films, and has served as a screenwriter for filmmakers Peter Chan, Johnnie To, Wai Ka-Fai, and Joe Ma.

Career
Matt Chow started his career at TVB in 1989 when he was hired by Joe Ma, who Chow considers to be his friend, teacher and boss.

Filmography

Producer
 Ghost Office (2001)     
 Let's Sing Along (2001)

Story
 Let's Sing Along (2001)

Director

 L - O - V - E ..... LOVE (1997)     
 PR Girls (1998)     
 United We Stand, And Swim (2001)     
 Let's Sing Along (2001)     
 The Attractive One (2004)     
 Itchy Heart (2004)
 Golden Chicken 3 (2014)
 12 Golden Ducks (2015)
 Triumph in the Skies (2015)

Actor

 Feel 100%, Once More (1996)
 Feel 100% (1996)
 July 13th (1996)     
 Till Death Do Us Laugh (1996)
 They Don't Care About Us (1996)     
 First Love Unlimited (1997)
 He Comes from Planet K (1997)
 Haunted Karaoke (1997)
 L - O - V - E ..... LOVE (1997)
 Too Many Ways To Be No. 1 (1997)     
 F***/Off (1998)     
 Portland Street Blues (1998)
 Love Generation Hong Kong (1998)
 Nude Fear (1998)
 Bio Zombie (1998)
 PR Girls (1998)     
 Afraid of Nothing, the Jobless King (1999)
 Bullets Over Summer (1999)
 Ghost Office (2001)
 La Brassiere (2001)
 Everyday Is Valentine (2001)
 You Shoot, I Shoot (2001)
 Shadow (2001)
 Feel 100% II (2001)
 Women From Mars (2002)
 The Irresistible Piggies (2002)
 Dry Wood Fierce Fire (2002)
 Beauty and the Breast (2002)
 Fighting to Survive (2002)
 Summer Breeze of Love (2002)
 Fat Choi Spirit (2002)
 Happy Family (2002)
 Love Undercover (2002)
 Loving Him (2002)
 The Mummy, Aged 19 (2002)
 U-Man (2002)     
 Star Runner (2003)
 Sound of Colors (2003)
 The Twins Effect (2003)
 Naked Ambition (2003)
 Love Is a Many Stupid Thing (2004)
 Hidden Heroes (2004)
 Three of a Kind (2004)
 Kung Fu Mahjong 2 (2005)
 Home Sweet Home (2005)
 A.V. (2005)     
 Love Undercover 3 (2006)
 Dating a Vampire (2006)
 Wife From Hell (2006)
 House of Mahjong (2007)
 Overheard 2 (2011)
 All's Well, Ends Well 2012 (2012)
 Mr. and Mrs. Gambler (2012)
 Vulgaria (2012)
 Diva (2012)
 SDU: Sex Duties Unit (2013)
 Full Strike (2015)
 Love off the Cuff (2017)
 First Night Nerves (2018)
 Missbehavior (2019)
 Raging Fire (2021)

Writer

 Hero from Beyond the Boundary of Time (1993)
 The Avenging Quartet (1993)
 Idol (1993)
 A Deadly Way (1994)
 The Day that Doesn't Exist (1995)
 Lying Hero (1995)
 The Little Drunken Masters (1995)
 Till Death Do Us Laugh (1996)
 Feel 100% (1996)
 Shanghai Grand (1996)
 July 13th (1996)
 He Comes from Planet K (1997)
 Too Many Ways To Be No. 1 (1997)
 Love, Amoeba Style (1997)
 L - O - V - E ..... LOVE (1997)
 First Love Unlimited (1997)
 Bio Zombie (1998)
 PR Girls (1998)
 Bullets Over Summer (1999)
 Juliet in Love (2000)
 Ghost Office (2001)
 United We Stand, And Swim (2001)
 Let's Sing Along (2001)
 Three: Going Home (2002)
 Golden Chicken (2002)
 Three (2002)
 Women From Mars (2002)
 Diva . Ah Hey (2003)
 The Attractive One (2004)
 Three of a Kind (2004)
 Itchy Heart (2004)
 Love Undercover 3 (2006)
 Dog Bite Dog (2006)
 Golden Chicken 3 (2014)
 Chilli Laugh Story (2022)

References

External links
 
 HK cinemagic entry

Year of birth missing (living people)
Living people
Hong Kong film producers
Hong Kong film directors
Hong Kong male film actors
Hong Kong screenwriters
Hong Kong people